Corporate surveillance is the monitoring of a person or group's behavior by a corporation. The data collected is most often used for marketing purposes or sold to other corporations, but is also regularly shared with government agencies. It can be used as a form of business intelligence, which enables the corporation to better tailor their products and/or services to be desirable by their customers. Although there is a common belief that monitoring can increase productivity, it can also create consequences such as increasing chances of deviant behavior and creating punishments that are not equitable to their actions.

The monitoring of customers or workers can cause resistance and a backlash because it insinuates a suspicion.

Sale of customer data

If it is business intelligence, data collected on individuals and groups can be sold to other corporations, so that they can use it for the aforementioned purpose. It can be used for direct marketing purposes, such as targeted advertisements on Google and Yahoo. These ads are tailored to the individual user of the search engine by analyzing their search history and emails (if they use free webmail services). 

For example, the world's most popular web search engine stores identifying information for each web search. Google stores an IP address and the search phrase used in a database for up to 2 years. Google also scans the content of emails of users of its Gmail webmail service, in order to create targeted advertising based on what people are talking about in their personal email correspondences. Google is, by far, the largest web advertising agency. Their revenue model is based on receiving payments from advertisers for each page-visit resulting from a visitor clicking on a Google AdWords ad, hosted either on a Google service or a third-party website. Millions of sites place Google's advertising banners and links on their websites, in order to share this profit from visitors who click on the ads. Each page containing Google advertisements adds, reads, and modifies cookies on each visitor's computer. These cookies track the user across all of these sites, and gather information about their web surfing habits, keeping track of which sites they visit, and what they do when they are on these sites. This information, along with the information from their email accounts, and search engine histories, is stored by Google to use for building a profile of the user to deliver better-targeted advertising.

Surveillance of workers

In 1993, David Steingard and Dale Fitzgibbons argued that modern management, far from empowering workers, had features of neo-Taylorism, where teamwork perpetuated surveillance and control. They argued that employees had become their own "thought police" and the team gaze was the equivalent of Bentham's panopticon guard tower. A critical evaluation of the Hawthorne Plant experiments has in turn given rise to the notion of a Hawthorne effect, where workers increase their productivity in response to their awareness of being observed or because they are gratified for being chosen to participate in a project.

Furthermore, about 30 percent of the companies had also fired employees for usage of "inappropriate or offensive language" and "viewing, downloading, or uploading inappropriate/offensive content." More than 40 percent of the companies monitor email traffic of their workers, and 66 percent of corporations monitor Internet connections. In addition, most companies use software to block websites such as sites with games, social networking, entertainment, shopping, and sports. The American Management Association and the  also stress that companies track content that is being written about them, for example by monitoring blogs and social media, and scanning all files that are stored in a filesystem.

Government use of corporate surveillance data
The United States government often gains access to corporate databases, either by producing a warrant for it, or by asking. The Department of Homeland Security has openly stated that it uses data collected from consumer credit and direct marketing agencies—such as Google—for augmenting the profiles of individuals whom it is monitoring. The US government has gathered information from grocery store discount card programs, which track customers' shopping patterns and store them in databases, in order to look for terrorists by analyzing shoppers' buying patterns.

Corporate surveillance of citizens
According to Dennis Broeders, "Big Brother is joined by big business". He argues that corporations are in any event interested in data on their potential customers and that placing some forms of surveillance in the hands of companies, results in companies owning video surveillance data for stores and public places. The commercial availability of surveillance systems has led to their rapid spread.  Therefore it is almost impossible for citizens to maintain their anonymity.

See also
 Big data
 Computer surveillance in the workplace
 Loyalty program
 Shopping cart software
 Surveillance capitalism

References

Financial data analysis
Data management